Peru competed at the 1980 Summer Olympics in Moscow, USSR.

Results by event

Athletics
Men's 100 metres
 José Luis Elias
 Heat — 13.66 (→ did not advance)

Men's 200 metres
 José Luis Elias
 Heat — did not start (→ did not advance)

Men's Long Jump
 Ronald Raborg
 Qualification — 6.85 m (→ did not advance)

Men's Decathlon
 Miro Ronac
 Final — did not finish (→ no ranking)

Women's 100 metres
 Carmela Bolivár
 Heat — 12.07 (→ did not advance)

Women's Javelin Throw
 Patricia Guerrero
 Qualification — 45.42 m (→ did not advance)

Swimming
Women's 100 m Breaststroke
María Pia Ayora
 Heats — 1:20.46 (→ did not advance)Women's 400 m Individual MedleyMaría Pia Ayora
 Heats — 5:27.19 (→ did not advance)

Volleyball
Women's Team Competition
 Preliminary Round (Group A) Lost to Soviet Union (1-3)
 Lost to Cuba (0-3)
 Lost to East Germany (2-3)
 Classification Match 5th/6th place: Lost to Cuba (1-3) → 6th placeTeam Roster'''
 Carmen Pimentel
 Gabriela Cardenas
 Rosa García
 Raquel Chumpitaz
 Ana Cecilia Carrillo
 Maria del Risco
 Cecilia Tait
 Silvia Leon
 Denisse Fajardo
 Aurora Heredia
 Gina Torrealva
 Natalia Málaga

References
Official Olympic Reports

1980 in Peruvian sport
Nations at the 1980 Summer Olympics
1980 Summer Olympics